Edwin Forrest Hutchinson (May 19, 1867 – July 19, 1934), was a Major League Baseball player who played second base for the Chicago Colts of the National League. He appeared in four games for the Colts in the 1890 season. He remained active in the minor leagues, mostly in western leagues, through 1906, and was briefly a player/manager for the Spokane Indians in 1906.

At the time of his death he lived in Colfax, California.

References

External links

1867 births
1934 deaths
Major League Baseball second basemen
Chicago Colts players
19th-century baseball players
Columbus Buckeyes (minor league) players
Zanesville Kickapoos players
Austin Senators players
Fort Worth Panthers players
Houston Mud Cats players
Sacramento Senators players
Oakland Colonels players
Los Angeles Angels (minor league) players
Omaha Omahogs players
St. Joseph Saints players
Scranton Miners players
Cedar Rapids Rabbits players
Sacramento Gilt Edges players
Oakland Oaks (baseball) players
Tacoma Tigers players
Grand Forks Forkers players
Victoria Legislators players
Spokane Indians players
St. Joseph Packers players
Hutchinson Salt Packers players
Minor league baseball managers
Baseball players from Pennsylvania
Savannah (minor league baseball) players